Mallotus is a genus of the spurge family Euphorbiaceae first described as a genus in 1790. Two species (M. oppositifolius and M. subulatus) are found in tropical Africa and Madagascar. All the other species are found in East Asia, the Indian Subcontinent, Southeast Asia, eastern Australia, and certain islands of the western Pacific. The genus has about 150 species of dioecious trees or shrubs.

Fossil record
Mallotus macrofossils have been recovered from the late Zanclean stage of Pliocene sites in Pocapaglia, Italy.

Uses
Mallotus species are used as food plants by the larvae of some Lepidoptera species including Endoclita malabaricus. The Kamala tree (Mallotus philippensis) has hairs of whose seed capsule which are the source of a yellow dye (kamala dye) and (formerly) herbal remedy.

Species

Formerly included
moved to other genera (Acalypha Aleurites Blumeodendron Chondrostylis Cleidion Croton Discocleidion Endospermum Hancea Lasiococca Macaranga Melanolepis Neoboutonia Plukenetia Ptychopyxis Rockinghamia Spathiostemon Sumbaviopsis )

Notes

References

 
Euphorbiaceae genera
Dioecious plants